Guinea women's national basketball team is the nationally basketball team representing Guinea at world basketball competitions for women.

African Championship record
1966 – 2nd
1970 – 5th
1974 – 7th
1984 – 8th
1994 – 8th
2011 – 11th
2015 – 9th
2017 – 10th
2021 – 12th

Current roster
Roster for the 2021 Women's Afrobasket.

References

External links

FIBA profile

Women's team
Women's national basketball teams
Basketball